André Bareau (December 31, 1921- March 2, 1993) was a prominent French Buddhologist and a leader in the establishment of the field of Buddhist Studies in the 20th century. He was a professor at the Collège de France from 1971 to 1991 and Director of the Study of Buddhist Philosophy at L'École Pratique des Hautes Études.

Bibliography
Bizot, François (1994), André Bareau (1921-1993), Bulletin de l'École française d'Extrême-Orient 81 (1), 6-9

External links
 La morale dans le bouddhisme ancien par André Bareau
 Notice biographique du Collège de France
 André Bareau vu par Jean-François Belzile

French scholars of Buddhism
French historians of religion
Collège de France alumni
1921 births
People from Saint-Mandé
1993 deaths